John Coburn   (23 September 1925 – 7 November 2006) was an Australian abstract painter, teacher, tapestry designer and printmaker.

Born in Ingham, Queensland, John Coburn moved from town to town with his mother and two younger sisters when his bank manager father went from branch to branch. His father died when the boy was 10.

While enlisted in the Royal Australian Navy during World War II, Coburn travelled around the Pacific and Indian oceans as a radio operator. He drew  images from these places whilst aboard HMAS Nepal, including Sri Lanka, Papua New Guinea and others.

Coburn studied art at East Sydney Technical College in 1947. He finished his four-year training dissatisfied:

By 1955–1956 Coburn was starting to find his own style.  In 1969 he told The Canberra Times :

In 1956 he joined the ABC when television came in. He specialised in set design and artwork.

Coburn taught art at East Sydney Technical College from 1959–1966 and he later became Head of the National Art School at the College for two years.

He won the Blake Prize for Religious Art twice, in 1960 and again in 1977 (shared with Rodney Milgate). In 1996 he won the Mandorla Art Award.

Major galleries in Australia have collected and displayed Coburn's works, many of which can now be found in major private and corporate collections, such as the Cbus Collection of Australian Art. For several years, two of his tapestries were hung in the Sydney Opera House, as curtains in the Drama Theatre and the (recently renamed) Joan Sutherland Theatre. Seven hang in the John F. Kennedy Center for the Performing Arts, Washington D.C. His works are also displayed in the Vatican Museum, Rome.

Notes and references

External links 
 Coburn Art
 Eva Breuer Art Dealer
 Obituary in the Sydney Morning Herald
 Mandorla Art Award

1925 births
2006 deaths
National Art School alumni
20th-century Australian painters
20th-century Australian male artists
Blake Prize for Religious Art winners
Royal Australian Navy personnel of World War II
Royal Australian Navy sailors
Australian male painters